Gobernador Garmendia is a small town in Burruyacú Department in the Tucumán Province of Argentina.  
It is named in honor of Pedro de Garmendia, appointed governor of Tucumán in 1840.

The town lies in an area where soybeans are grown.  There is high unemployment and limited state jobs or private commercial activity.

References

Populated places in Tucumán Province